The Central Uruguay Railway (CUR) was one of the five original rail systems in Uruguay. The other four were the Midland Uruguay Railway Co., the North Western of Uruguay, the Uruguay Northern, and the Uruguay East Coast Railway. CUR, including its leased and worked lines, was considered the most important system. The system operated four sections: the Central Uruguay Railway Original Line (including the Northeastern Line), ; the Northern Extension Railway, ; the Eastern Extension Railway, ; and the Western Extension Railway, .

Overview

Central Uruguay Railway Co. of Montevideo, Ltd. was registered In London in 1876.  It was the largest railway company in Uruguay. It operated from 1 January 1878 to January 31, 1949, when railroads were nationalized. It worked, leased and absorbed some smaller rail systems. By the end of the era of British railways in Uruguay, CUR had a network of  standard gauge, about half of the total within the country. In 1936, it owned 128 steam locomotives, 119 coaches and 2302 goods wagons. In 1891, CUR's British and Uruguayan employees founded the Central Uruguay Railway Cricket Club.

Routes
The Central Co. included the Central Uruguay and the Northeastern lines. It operated the lines of the Western Extension, the Northern Extension, and the Eastern Extension companies. The Central ran from Montevideo to Santa Isabel, across the Rio Negro, with a branch from Santa Lucia to San José de Mayo; the Northeastern connected Montevideo and Minas. The Western Extension ran from San Jose to Mercedes, with a branch to the port of Colonia. The Northern Extension continued the Central from Santa Izabel to Rivera on the Brazilian border. The Eastern Extension started from a point on the Northeastern  from Montevideo and ran to Melo, with a branch to Treinta y Tres.

See also
 Central Uruguay Railway Cricket Club 
 Rail transport in Uruguay

References

External links
 

Central
Railway lines opened in 1878
Defunct railway companies of Uruguay